The 1985 Tulsa Golden Hurricane football team represented the University of Tulsa as a member of the Missouri Valley Conference (MVC) during the 1985 NCAA Division I-A football season. In their first year under head coach Don Morton, the Golden Hurricane compiled an overall record of 6–5 record with a mark of 5–0 against conference opponents, winning the MVC title for the sixth consecutive season.

The team's statistical leaders included quarterback Steve Gage with 1,069 passing yards, Gordon Brown with 1,201 rushing yards, and Ronnie Kelly with 379 receiving yards.

Schedule

Notes

References

Tulsa
Tulsa Golden Hurricane football seasons
Missouri Valley Conference football champion seasons
Tulsa Golden Hurricane football